François de Clermont-Tonnerre (1629 – 15 February 1701) was a French aristocrat and cleric. He served as the Count of Noyon, Bishop of Noyon, a pair de France and a member of the Conseil d'État.

Early life
Jean François de Clermont-Tonnerre was born in 1629. He was the younger son of comte François de Clermont-Tonnerre (1601-1679) and Marie Vignier de Saint-Liebaut. He received a doctorate at the Sorbonne after studying under the Jesuits.

Vocation
In 1694, he was appointed to replace Barbier d'Aucour at the Académie française and in 1695 became president of the Assembly of the French clergy. He also wrote some religious works, including a Rule of Saint Benedict (1687). At the time of his death, he was working on a Commentaire mystique et moral sur l'Ancien Testament.

He was summoned to the court of Louis XIV, who wanted to amuse himself with his excessive vanity. Clermont-Tonnerre founded a prize for poetry of 3,000 francs, whose topic was always to be an elegy on Louis XIV and his deeds.

Death
He died on 15 February 1701.

References

1629 births
1701 deaths
Members of the Académie française
Francois de
Bishops of Noyon
17th-century peers of France
18th-century peers of France